Enyalius or Enyalios in Greek mythology is generally a son of Ares by Enyo and also a byname of Ares the god of war. Though Enyalius as a by-name of Ares is the most accepted version, in Mycenaean times Ares and Enyalius were considered separate deities. Enyalius is often seen as the God of soldiers and warriors from Ares cult. On the Mycenaean Greek Linear B KN V 52 tablet, the name , e-nu-wa-ri-jo, has been interpreted to refer to this same Enyalios. It has been suggested that the name of Enyalius ultimately represents an Anatolian loanword, although alternative hypotheses treat it as an inherited Indo-European compound or a borrowing from an indigenous language of Crete. 

Enyalios is mentioned nine times in Homer's Iliad and in four of them it is in the same formula describing Meriones who is one of the leaders of warriors from Crete. Homer calls Ares by the epithet Enyalios  in Iliad, book xx.

A scholiast on Homer declares that the poet Alcman sometimes identified Ares with Enyalius and sometimes differentiated him, and that Enyalius was sometimes made the son of Ares by Enyo and sometimes the son of Cronus and Rhea.

Aristophanes (in Peace) envisages Ares and Enyalios as separate gods of war.

In the Anabasis, Xenophon mentions that the Greek mercenaries raise a war cry to Enyalios as they charge at the Persian Army. 

In Argonautica book III, lines 363–367, Jason sets the chthonic earthborn warriors fighting among themselves by hurling a boulder in their midst:

But Jason called to mind the counsels of Medea full of craft, and seized from the plain a huge round boulder, a terrible quoit of Ares Enyalius; four stalwart youths could not have raised it from the ground even a little.

The urbane Alexandrian author gives his old tale a touch of appropriate Homeric antiquity by using such an ancient epithet.

Plutarch, in Moralia (2nd century), tells of the bravery of the women of Argos, in the 5th century BC, who repulsed the attacks of kings of Sparta. The survivors erected a temple to Ares Enyalius by the road where they fell:

After the city was saved, they buried the women who had fallen in battle by the Argive road, and as a memorial to the achievements of the women who were spared they dedicated a temple to Ares Enyalius... Up to the present day they celebrate the Festival of Impudence (Hybristika) on the anniversary [of the battle], putting the women into men's tunics and cloaks and the men in women's dresses and head-coverings.

According to Pausanias (3.15.7), the Lacedaemonians believed that by chaining up Enyalius, they would prevent the god from deserting Sparta. Pausanias also mentions at 3.14.9 and 3.20.2 that puppies were sacrificed to Enyalius in Sparta.

Polybius' history renders the Roman god Mars by Greek Ares but the Roman god Quirinus by Enyalius, and the same identifications are made by later writers such as Dionysius of Halicarnassus, perhaps only because it made sense that a Roman god who was sometimes confounded with Mars and sometimes differentiated should be represented in Greek by a name that was similarly sometimes equated with Ares (who definitely corresponded with Mars) and was sometimes differentiated.

Josephus in his Antiquities 4, (3)[115] states after telling the story of the Tower of Babel:

But as to the plan of Shinar, in the country of Babylonia, Hestiaeus mentions it, when he says thus: "Such of the priests as were saved, took the sacred vessels of Zeus Enyalius, and came to Shinar of Babylonia."

Notes 

Epithets of Ares
Children of Ares
Greek gods
War gods
Greek war deities